Louis Grisius (14 November 1936 – 13 February 2011) was a Luxembourgian cyclist. He competed in the individual road race and team time trial events at the 1960 Summer Olympics.

References

External links
 

1936 births
2011 deaths
Luxembourgian male cyclists
Olympic cyclists of Luxembourg
Cyclists at the 1960 Summer Olympics
Sportspeople from Esch-sur-Alzette